Conus pictus is a species of sea snail, a marine gastropod mollusk in the family Conidae, the cone snails and their allies.

Like all species within the genus Conus, these snails are predatory and venomous. They are capable of "stinging" humans, therefore live ones should be handled carefully or not at all.

Subspecies 
 Conus pictus pictus Reeve, 1843
 Conus pictus transkeiensis  Korn, W.  1998 (synonym: Sciteconus pictus transkeiensis Korn, 1998)

Description
The size of the shell varies between 26 mm and 50 mm. The shell is chestnut-colored, with two or three pink bands, and a few narrow lines, ornamented with reddish or chestnut spots. The spire is maculated.

Distribution
This marine species occurs off Jeffrey's Bay - East London, Republic South Africa

References

 Sowerby, G. B., III. 1911. Description of a new species of the genus Conus from South Africa. Proceedings of the Malacological Society of London 9(6):352, fig.
 Tucker J.K. & Tenorio M.J. (2013) Illustrated catalog of the living cone shells. 517 pp. Wellington, Florida: MdM Publishing.
 Puillandre N., Duda T.F., Meyer C., Olivera B.M. & Bouchet P. (2015). One, four or 100 genera? A new classification of the cone snails. Journal of Molluscan Studies. 81: 1–23

Gallery
Conus pictus transkeiensis

External links
 The Conus Biodiversity website
 Cone Shells - Knights of the Sea
 

pictus
Gastropods described in 1843